Meszno may refer to the following places:
Meszno, Lubartów County in Lublin Voivodeship (east Poland)
Meszno, Lublin County in Lublin Voivodeship (east Poland)
Meszno, Opole Voivodeship (south-west Poland)
Meszno, Warmian-Masurian Voivodeship (north Poland)